Vadim Perelman (born 8 September 1963) is a Ukrainian-Canadian-American film director. Perelman made his feature film directorial debut in 2003 with House of Sand and Fog, following a successful career as a commercial director.  The film, nominated for three Academy Awards, also marks his first screenplay credit.  Perelman was drawn to the story, having been shaped by his own immigrant experience.

Early life and work 
Born in Kyiv, Ukrainian SSR (now in Ukraine), Perelman was an only child who lived with his extended family in a communal flat. He is from a Jewish background. When Perelman was nine, his father was killed in a car accident. Five years later, he and his mother were granted permission to leave Kyiv and lived in Vienna for two months before moving to Rome, a transfer point in the 1980s for Jewish emigrants from the USSR.

Remembering that period, Perelman likens himself to the kids in Luis Buñuel's Los Olvidados — a street urchin "always searching for a hunk of bread or a scam to pull."  He supported himself and his young mother in this fashion for a year.  When a Canadian visa finally came, they left for that country where Perelman would ultimately build a new life and start his career.

Following some rather tumultuous teenage years, Perelman finally began to concentrate on his formal education. He attended the University of Alberta, majoring in physics and maths, before a sophomore-year class in film-making completely changed his focus.  Moving to Toronto, he studied film at Ryerson University's School of Image Arts for two years, before launching his own Toronto-based production house, called Canned Films.  After honing his skills directing and editing music videos, he decided to make the move to Los Angeles to further his career.

Over the next three years, Perelman directed multinational television commercials for Microsoft, General Motors, Panasonic, Nike, Airwalk, AT&T, Sony PlayStation, Coors and MasterCard, and music videos including Kelly Clarkson's "Because of You."

Film directorial career 
Perelman is known for being very selective about his projects. "I don’t want to spend a year of my life working on a film that does not resonate with me on an emotional level. Since great scripts are a rare commodity, I realized that I have to create my own opportunities and not wait for the right project to come along — for fate to smile upon me."

With this in mind, Perelman began to option the film rights to literary works. He discovered House of Sand and Fog by Andre Dubus III before it was an acclaimed bestseller and an Oprah selection. "I closed that book after I finished it, and through the tears managed to call my agent to check into the rights." Perelman got Shawn Otto to adapt the novel for the screen, and went on to attach Ben Kingsley and Jennifer Connelly to the project, raised financing, and parked himself at the helm of his first feature film. DreamWorks acquired domestic distribution rights and released the film to great critical acclaim.

Perelman's second feature film, The Life Before Her Eyes, was shot in 2006 in Connecticut. The film, independently financed by 2929 Productions, stars Uma Thurman and Evan Rachel Wood. It is based on the novel of the same name by Laura Kasischke. Emil Stern adapted the book for the screen. Perelman produced the film along with Aimee Peyronnet and Anthony Katagas.

In 2007, he was attached to the film adaptation of Ayn Rand's Atlas Shrugged.

Films
House of Sand and Fog (2003)
The Life Before Her Eyes (2007)
Yolki 5 (2016)
Buy Me (2018)
Persian Lessons (2020)

References

External links

1963 births
American film directors
Film directors from Ontario
Living people
Film people from Kyiv
Ukrainian emigrants to Canada
Ukrainian Jews